Slavinje is a village on the road between Hruševje and Razdrto in the Municipality of Postojna in the Inner Carniola region of Slovenia.

Geography
The newer part of Slavinje lies along the main road, and the older part of the village stands on a rise immediately south of the road. Before water mains were installed in the village, water was obtained from wells and cisterns, and from nearby Hornbeam Spring (Pod gabrom). A spring in the lower part of the village has been impounded for use as a water source for livestock. There is a karst spring in a meadow in the woods south of the village.

Name
The name Slavinje, like the related place name Slavina, is derived from the nickname Slavo or *Slavъ, found as a second element in various names (e.g., *Dobroslavъ, *Pribyslavъ, etc.). The name therefore originally means 'Slavo's village', referring to an early inhabitant.

History
After the war, agricultural land in the village was consolidated into the Hruševje unit of the Postojna collective farm (KZ Postojna).

Church

The local church in the settlement is dedicated to Saint Gertrude and belongs to the Parish of Hrenovice. The church is an originally medieval Gothic structure that was reworked in the Baroque style in 1638, as indicated by the year carved above the entrance. The rectangular nave terminates in a slightly narrower chancel walled on three sides. The church has a bell gable above an open narthex.

References

External links

Slavinje on Geopedia

Populated places in the Municipality of Postojna